Gonyostomus is a genus of air-breathing land snails, terrestrial pulmonate gastropod mollusks in the family Strophocheilidae endemic to Brazil.

Species 
Species within the  genus Gonyostomus include:
 Gonyostomus egregius (Pfeiffer, 1845)
 Gonyostomus elinae Simone, 2016
 Gonyostomus gonyostomus (Férussac, 1821)
 Gonyostomus insularis Leme, 1974
 Gonyostomus turnix (Férussac, 1821)
Gonyostomus turnix var. albolabiatus Jaeckel, 1927

References

Strophocheilidae
Taxonomy articles created by Polbot